Eseosa Fostine "Fausto" Desalu (born 19 February 1994) is an Italian sprinter who specialises in the 200 metres winning a silver medal in that event at the 2018 Mediterranean Games and a gold medal in the 4×100 m relay at the 2020 Summer Olympics.

He was the 200 metres gold medallist at the 2015 Military World Games. He holds a best of 20.13 seconds for the distance, set in 2018.

Biography
Of Nigerian descent, he acquired Italian citizenship in 2012, at 18 years old as he was born in Casalmaggiore, Italy, to Nigerian parents. Desalu originally focused on association football in his youth. However, he began to take up track and field around 2008, initially focusing on the sprint hurdles. His speed was better than his technique and he eventually focused on the 200 m instead. He gained full Italian citizenship in 2012. A member of Gruppi Sportivi Fiamme Gialle – the sports club of Italy's fiscal police force – he made his international debut at the 2012 World Junior Championships in Athletics. However, he failed to progress beyond the heats. He also ran with the 4×100 metres relay team, but they were also eliminated in the heats stage.

Desalu's first international medal came at the 2013 European Athletics Junior Championships, where he was a relay bronze medallist on home turf in Rieti, running the anchor leg on a team of Giacomo Isolano, Lorenzo Bilotti and Roberto Rigali. He also managed fifth place individually in the 200 m. His first senior medal followed at the 2014 European Team Championships, where he was part of the bronze medal-winning relay quartet alongside Massimiliano Ferraro, Diego Marani, and Delmas Obou. He was selected both individually and for the relay for Italy at the 2014 European Athletics Championships. He was a semi-finalist in the 200 m, having set a best of 20.55 seconds in the heats, and was a finalist in the relay with Fabio Cerutti, Marani and Obou (although the Italians failed to finish).

Desalu had his first appearance at global senior level at the 2015 IAAF World Relays, though the regrouped European Championships team did not make it past the heats. At the 2015 Military World Games he won the 200 m gold medal, a tenth of a second ahead of runner-up Serhiy Smelyk. He came close to a second medal at the games in the relay, placing fourth with Cerutti, Obou and Matteo Galvan.

In La Chaux-de-Fonds, he runs in 20.36 on 15 August 2020, best European performance of the year on 200 m. On 19 August, he improves at 20.35 (+1.3) at Bregyó Athletic Center, Székesfehérvár.  On 4 September 2020, he becomes the first Italian to win a 200 m race event of the Diamond League during Memorial Van Damme in 20.39.

Statistics

National records
 4×100 m relay: 37.50 ( Tokyo, 6 August 2021), he ran third leg in the team with Lorenzo Patta, Marcell Jacobs, Filippo Tortu.

Personal bests
60 metres – 6.76 seconds (2015)
100 metres – 10.21 seconds (2022)
200 metres – 20.13 seconds (2018)
110 metres hurdles – 14.20 seconds (2010)
60 metres hurdles – 7.86 seconds (2011)
All information from European Athletics

For reference:
split time of 4×100m relay - 9.170 (third leg) (2021)

Achievements

1Did not finish in the final

National titles
Desalu won three national championships at individual senior level.

Italian Athletics Championships
200 m: 2016, 2017, 2021 (3)

See also
 List of European records in athletics
 List of Italian records in athletics
 Italian all-time lists - 200 m
 Italian all-time lists - 4×100 m relay
 Italian national track relay team

References

External links
 

Living people
1994 births
People from Casalmaggiore
Italian male sprinters
Athletics competitors of Fiamme Gialle
Italian people of Nigerian descent
Italian sportspeople of African descent
Athletes (track and field) at the 2016 Summer Olympics
Athletes (track and field) at the 2020 Summer Olympics
Olympic athletes of Italy
Athletes (track and field) at the 2018 Mediterranean Games
Mediterranean Games silver medalists for Italy
Mediterranean Games medalists in athletics
World Athletics Championships athletes for Italy
Italian Athletics Championships winners
Medalists at the 2020 Summer Olympics
Olympic gold medalists for Italy
Olympic gold medalists in athletics (track and field)
Sportspeople from the Province of Cremona